Oxford Parliament  may refer to:

 The Oxford Parliament (1258), also known as the Mad Parliament and the "First English Parliament", assembled during the reign of Henry III of England
 The Oxford Parliament (1644), 1644–1645, during the reign of Charles I of England
 The Oxford Parliament (1681) assembled in 1681 during the reign of Charles II of England

See also
 Oxfordshire County Council, the local authority
 List of parliaments of England